The Evalue people are an Akan people who live in southwestern Ghana and across the border in Ivory Coast.

References

Sources

Ethnic groups in Ghana
Ethnic groups in Ivory Coast
Akan